Fladimir da Cruz Freitas, better known as Lico (Lico; born January 20, 1974, in Brazil), is a retired Brazilian footballer who is now the Head coach for the Campeonato Brasileiro Série D club Cerâmica. He is notable for his brilliant performance in Sun Hei during 2005-06 season.

Honours
Xiangxue Sun Hei
Hong Kong FA Cup: 2005–06

Individual
Hong Kong FA Cup Top Scorer: 2005–06

Career statistics

Club career
As of December 22, 2006

Notes and references

External links
Lico at HKFA
Profile at sunhei.goalgoalgoal.com 

1974 births
Living people
Brazilian footballers
Brazilian expatriate footballers
Sun Hei SC players
Eastern Sports Club footballers
Association football midfielders
Hong Kong First Division League players
Expatriate footballers in Hong Kong
Brazilian expatriate sportspeople in Hong Kong
Hong Kong League XI representative players